The jack of spades (also called the "knave of spades") is a playing card in the standard 52-card deck.

Jack of Spades may also refer to:
 Jack of Spades (film), a 1960 French drama film directed by Yves Allégret
 Jack of Spades, a fictional character, a member of the villainous Royal Flush Gang in DC Comics
 Jack of Spades, a 2015 book by Joyce Carol Oates
 The Jack of Spades, a historical novella in Special Assignments: The Further Adventures of Erast Fandorin

See also

 or 

 Knave (disambiguation)
 Jack of Clubs (disambiguation)
 Jack of Diamonds (disambiguation)
 Jack of Hearts (disambiguation)
 Queen of Spades (disambiguation)
 King of Spades (disambiguation)
 Ace of Spades (disambiguation)